Figueredo is a Spanish surname. It may refer to.

Aurelio José Figueredo, an American evolutionary psychologist
Diego Figueredo, a Paraguayan football player
Eugenio Figueredo, a Uruguayan association football executive
Fernando Figueredo, a Florida politician
Ignacio Figueredo, a Venezuelan folk musician
Jorge Figueredo, a senior vice president at Dow Jones & Company
Perucho Figueredo, the author of the Cuban national anthem, El Himno de Bayamo
James Figueredo, Murfreesboro Tn

Galician-language surnames